Alabama has a rich history and diversity of freshwater and saltwater sport fishing opportunities within its extensive rivers systems, farm ponds and the inshore and offshore saltwater of the Gulf of Mexico.,  The Bass Angler's Sportsman Society (B.A.S.S.), the leading promoter of competitive bass fishing was founded by Ray Scott in 1967 in Montgomery, Alabama. Alabama hosts numerous local, regional and national fishing tournaments every year.

Alabama supports 11 million angler fishing days with expenditures of three-quarters of a billion dollars, so join in the fun!

Freshwater fishing

The Official Freshwater Fish of Alabama is the Largemouth Bass.  In general, Alabama freshwater fishing is a warmwater fishery, although stocked trout are available in several locations.  The most targeted species are largemouth and smallmouth bass, spotted bass, crappie, brim (bluegill, shellcracker, etc.), stripe (white bass, striped bass and hybrids) as well as catfish.  There are limited fisheries for shoal bass, walleye and sauger.  Big rivers and reservoirs dominate the freshwater fishing landscape in Alabama but there is also an abundance of small streams, creeks and ponds available.  The Tennessee Valley Authority, US Army Corps of Engineers, Alabama Power, and the Alabama Department of Natural Resources all maintain and promote freshwater fishing access on the waters they oversee.

State Freshwater Records
Below is a table of state freshwater fishing records.

Saltwater fishing

 Alabama has excellent access to the offshore waters of the Gulf of Mexico from Mobile and Perdio Bays.  Inshore and estuarial fishing opportunities are extensive in both upper and lower Mobile Bay, but extend from Grand Bay in the Mississippi Sound on the West to the western shores of Peridio Bay near Orange Beach, Alabama.

The Official Saltwater Fish of Alabama is the Tarpon.

State Saltwater Records

See also

 List of rivers in Alabama
 List of lakes in Alabama
 US Army Corps of Engineers - Lakes Gateway - Alabama
 Tennessee Valley Authority - Reservoir Sport Fishing
 Alabama Power Lake Recreation Information
 Bear Creek Lakes Recreation Area
 Alabama River Fishing

References

Notes

External links
 Official Alabama DCNR Fishing Regulations Guide
 Southern Fishing News - Alabama

Fishing in the United States
Sports in Alabama by sport